Antarchaea erubescens is a species of moth of the family Noctuidae first described by Andreas Bang-Haas in 1910. It is found from Morocco to the Arabian Peninsula southern Iran and Afghanistan.

Adults are on wing from April to June and again in autumn. There are two generations per year.

External links

Image

Catocalinae
Moths described in 1910
Moths of the Arabian Peninsula
Moths of Africa
Moths of the Middle East